José Pedro Díaz (January 12, 1921 - July 3, 2006) was a Uruguayan essayist, educator and writer.

He is remembered as a member of the Generation of 45, a Uruguayan intellectual and literary movement: Carlos Maggi, Manuel Flores Mora, Ángel Rama, Emir Rodríguez Monegal, Idea Vilariño, Carlos Real de Azúa, Carlos Martínez Moreno, Mario Arregui, Mauricio Muller, Amanda Berenguer, Tola Invernizzi, Mario Benedetti, Ida Vitale, Líber Falco, Juan Cunha, Juan Carlos Onetti, among others.

Works

Poetry
Canto full. First notebook, Montevideo, Printing "Stella", 1939.
Canto full. Second notebook, Montevideo, "Printing of John Cunha Dotti", 1940.
Treaty of flame, Montevideo, La Galatea, 1957.
Exercises anthropological, Xalapa (Mexico), Universidad Veracruzana, 1967.
New treaties and other exercises (Montevideo, Ark., 1982.

Narrative
The range rose. Suite old. Montevideo, press brakes Sixth Vocal Group, 1941.
The inhabitant, Montevideo, La Galatea, 1949.
Fires of San Telmo, Montevideo, Ark., 1964.
Parts of shipwrecks, Montevideo, Ark., 1969.

Testing and review
A conference on Julio Herrera y Reissig, Montevideo, s / e, 1948
Poetry and magic, Montevideo, s / e, 1949
Gustavo Adolfo Becquer: life and poetry, Montevideo: The Galatea, 1953.
The search for the origin and the impulse to adventure in the narrative of André Gide, Montevideo, University of the Republic, 1958
Balzac novel and society, Montevideo, Ark, 1974
The imaginary spectacle, Montevideo. Ark, 1986
Juan Carlos Onetti. The show imaginary II Montevideo, Ark., 1989.
Felisberto Hernandez. The show imaginary I, Montevideo. Ark 1991
Novel and Society, Xalapa, Veracruz University, 1992.
Felisberto Hernandez his life and work, Nairobi, Metro 1999.

References 

1921 births
2006 deaths
Uruguayan essayists
20th-century Uruguayan poets
Uruguayan male poets
Uruguayan novelists
Male novelists
Uruguayan educators
People from Montevideo
20th-century novelists
Male essayists
20th-century essayists
20th-century Uruguayan male writers